Robyn Forbes (born 24 April 1972) is an Australian gymnast who competed at the Sydney 2000 Olympic Games.

Forbes was born in Brisbane on 24 April 1972. She began gymnastics at the age of ten and belonged to the Wynham PYC, where her first coach was Melanie Tonks.

She represented Australia at eight World Championships between 1990 and 2003.

At the Sydney 2000 Olympics Forbes competed in the women's individual trampoline event and finished tenth.

References 

1972 births
Living people
Gymnasts at the 2000 Summer Olympics
Australian female trampolinists
Olympic gymnasts of Australia